Magallanes is a 2014 Peruvian drama film directed by Salvador del Solar. It was screened in the Contemporary World Cinema section of the 2015 Toronto International Film Festival. In 2016 it won the Havana Star Prize for Best Film (Fiction) at the Havana Film Festival New York.

Cast
 Damián Alcázar as Harvey Magallanes
 Magaly Solier as Celina

References

External links
 

2014 films
2014 drama films
Peruvian drama films
Tondero Producciones films
2014 directorial debut films
2010s Peruvian films
2010s Spanish-language films